"Ooh La La" is a song by English electronic music duo the Wiseguys from their second album, The Antidote (1998). First released as a single in 1998, it peaked at number 55 on the UK Singles Chart, but a re-release the following year proved highly successful after its inclusion in a Budweiser advertisement, this time reaching number two on the UK chart. The original release also reached number 87 in the Netherlands, while the re-release peaked at number seven in Iceland.

Composition
The song has a BPM of 124. It samples "Jim on the Move" by Lalo Schifrin.

Commercial performance
Initially, the song reached number 55 on the UK Singles Chart and also charted in the Netherlands at number 87. Upon its re-release on 24 May 1999, it re-entered the UK chart, going to number two. The song spent a total of 14 weeks on the chart. In Iceland, "Ooh La La" debuted and peaked at number seven in June 1999.

Music video
A music video for the video was released, set at an airport and featuring scantily-clad dancers.

Charts

Weekly charts

Year-end charts

Certifications

Release history

References

1998 songs
1998 singles
1999 singles
The Wiseguys songs
Wall of Sound (record label) singles